The 1923 San Diego State football team represented San Diego State Teachers College during the 1923 NCAA football season. Even though San Diego State became a four-year institution prior to the 1921 season, they competed in the Southern California Junior College Conference from 1921 to 1924. For conference games, only freshmen and sophomores were eligible to play.

The school's nickname "Aztecs" did not come into being until the 1925 season. From 1921 to 1924, there was no official nickname. At various times, publications used the term "Professors", "Wampus Cats", "Staters" and "Statesmen". The yearbook "Del Sudoeste" published at the end of the 1924–25 school year notes that January 6, 1925 was the date that "Berry, Schellbach and Osenburg christen college 'Aztecs' ".

The 1923 San Diego State team was led by head coach Charles E. Peterson in his third season as football coach of the Aztecs. They played home games at both Balboa Stadium and at a field on campus. The Aztecs finished the season as champion of the SCJCC for the second consecutive year, with eight wins and two losses (8–2, 2–0 SCJCC). Overall, the team outscored its opponents 207–82 points for the season.

Schedule

Notes

References

San Diego State
San Diego State Aztecs football seasons
San Diego State football